The fifth and final season of the CBS action-adventure series MacGyver premiered on December 4, 2020 for the 2020–21 television season. CBS renewed the series for a fifth season in May 2020 and announced it would be the final season in April 2021. The season contained fifteen episodes and concluded on April 30, 2021. MacGyver, a remake of the 1985 series of the same name, centers on the fictional Phoenix Foundation which is a covert organization masquerading as a think tank. The series stars Lucas Till, Tristin Mays, Justin Hires, Meredith Eaton, Levy Tran and Henry Ian Cusick. Jorge Garcia appeared in the eighth episode of the season as his Hawaii Five-0 character.

The season was also the only season not to have Peter M. Lenkov serving as a showrunner after he was fired prior to the season over allegations of creating a toxic work environment. Monica Macer, who joined the series as an executive producer a month before Lenkov was fired, served as the showrunner for the season. The season premiere, "Resort + Desi + Riley + Window Cleaner + Witness", was watched by 4.90 million viewers, while the season finale, "Abduction + Memory + Time + Fireworks + Dispersal", was watched by 4.48 million viewers. The most watched episode of the season was the fourth episode, "Banh Bao + Sterno + Drill + Burner + Mason", with 5.17 million viewers.

Cast and characters

Main
 Lucas Till as Angus "Mac" MacGyver
 Tristin Mays as Riley Davis
 Justin Hires as Wilt Bozer
 Meredith Eaton as Matilda "Matty" Webber
 Levy Tran as Desiree "Desi" Nguyen
 Henry Ian Cusick as Russell "Russ/Rusty" Taylor

Recurring
 Alexandra Grey as Parker

Guest Stars
 Anabelle Acosta as Paula
 Camilla Arfwedson as Sofia Walker
 Tobin Bell as Leland
 David Dastmalchian as Murdoc
 Ernie Hudson as Milton Bozer
 Dan Lauria as Lenny Krengel
 Zach McGowan as Roman
 Aly Michalka as Franklin "Frankie" Mallory
 Aimee Mullins as Jess Miller
 Bojana Novakovic as Anya Vitez
 Joe Pantoliano as Eric "General Ma" Andrews
 Wendy Raquel Robinson as Lauretta Bozer
 Peter Weller as Elliot Mason

Crossover

 Jorge Garcia as Jerry Ortega

Episodes

The number in the "No. overall" column refers to the episode's number within the overall series, whereas the number in the "No. in season" column refers to the episode's number within this particular season. "U.S. viewers (millions)" refers to the number of viewers in the U.S. in millions who watched the episode as it was aired.

Production

Development
The season was ordered on May 6, 2020. Prior to the season, Teresa Huang was hired as the story editor for the series. On June 12, 2020, the series' writers announced that they had started working on writing for the season.

This was also the first and only season without Peter M. Lenkov as showrunner, after he was fired from both MacGyver and Magnum P.I. on July 7, 2020 by CBS, following allegations that he created a toxic work environment. Lenkov had also been the showrunner for Hawaii Five-0, which had already concluded its ten season run prior to his firing. Also, as a result of his firing, he also lost the final year on his overall deal with CBS Television Studios. In response to his firing, Lenkov said, "I accept responsibility for what I am hearing, and am committed to doing the work that is required to do better and be better." Monica Macer, who was hired as an executive producer on the series in June 2020, replaced Lenkov as the showrunner. Series star Lucas Till said that Lenkov's actions, particularly during the first season, caused him to feel suicidal, and drove him to his breaking point. Till also said that Lenkov bullied, verbally abused, and body-shamed him. A spokesperson for Lenkov stated that Till's accusations were not true, and that Lenkov had always supported Till.

On August 12, 2020, it was announced that CBS Television Studios had signed a deal with the law enforcement advisory group 21CP Solutions, to consult on its crime and legal dramas, which includes MacGyver. 21CP Solutions will help the series' to more accurately portray law enforcement. This comes after the George Floyd protests, which caused the television industry to rethink their portrayal of law enforcement.

Filming
On November 11, 2020, Justin Hires announced that filming had started on the season. There were nine remaining episodes written for the fourth season that were then completed and aired as part of the fifth season. Filming on the season had been completed prior to the series' cancellation.

Casting
One of the remaining episodes from the fourth season included a crossover appearance from Jorge Garcia as Jerry Ortega, his character from Hawaii Five-0.

On February 18, 2021, it was announced that Alexandra Grey had been cast in a recurring role as Parker, a transgender female Phoenix engineer who assists the team. The following day, Ernie Hudson and Wendy Raquel Robinson were revealed to have been cast as Milton and Lauretta Bozer, the parents of Hires' character, Wilt. Multiple actors reprised their roles from previous seasons, including Aly Michalka and David Dastmalchian.

Cancellation and future

On April 7, 2021, it was announced that MacGyver would end after five seasons with the series finale being set for April 30, 2021. The series was averaging 5.85 million viewers an episode when the decision was made. Kelly Kahl, CBS' Entertainment President, stated about the decision "All of us at CBS are extremely grateful for the incredible work and dedication from Lucas and the rest of the cast, as well as Monica, the writers and the entire crew, the MacGyver team traveled far and wide to repeatedly save the world with little more than bubble gum and a paper clip and made this show distinctly their own. We're gratified we get to give this dedicated and loyal fan base the opportunity to say goodbye to their favorite characters in the thoughtful manner this series deserves." Macer said the news came as a shock to her and that the network informed her of the cancellation first and allowed her time to tell the cast and crew prior to making the news public. Because filming on the season was finished, Macer also had to turn what she planned on being a season finale, into a series finale using the already completed footage. Once the news became public, fans of the series organized a loose campaign titled "#SaveMacGyver." Within 48 hours a hashtag calling for the renewal of the series trended on Twitter in multiple countries, gaining over 116,000 tweets in support. A Change.org petition with the same goal raised over 29,000 signatures. 1.35 million paperclips, a signature tool of Angus MacGyver's were sent to CBS Studio Center in Los Angeles, California, with several thousand more sent directly to Kahl's office in New York City. Numerous billboards were also purchased in effort of the campaign.

Following the series finale, Macer shared her plans for a sixth season in an interview. The planned sixth season would have included a Black Hawk Down-style episode centered around Tran's character, Desi, and her presumed dead ex-fiancé, Evan. This storyline would have allowed a romance between MacGyver and Riley, the characters of Till and Mays, respectively; who would have gotten together early in the sixth season. In 2022 Lenkov also shared his original plans for a fifth season finale that also would have set up a sixth season. In a rough scriptment for the fifth season finale, titled "Biometric + Compass + Paperclip + Family + Goodbye", the episode would have featured a time jump to the year 2035 that introduced the future son of MacGyver and Riley. The time jump would have also led to a relationship between MacGyver and Riley early in the sixth season. In Macer's version of the sixth season Desi and Evan would have began a relationship; Riley then would have attempted to resign from the Phoenix Foundation, causing a fight between MacGyver and Riley that led to their first kiss. Other storylines for Macer's sixth season would have included Cusick's and Arfwedson's characters having a child; further exploration of the parents of Hires' character; and Eaton's character assigning Riley to an undercover project.

Release
The season premiered during the 2020–21 television season as part of CBS's Friday lineup with Magnum P.I. and Blue Bloods. On August 26, 2020, it was announced that CBS hoped to begin airing the season in November 2020. On November 9, 2020, it was announced that the season would premiere on December 4, 2020.

Viewing figures

References

MacGyver
2020 American television seasons
2021 American television seasons